Nine Mile Point railway station was a halt on the Newport to Tredegar line of the Sirhowy Railway.  It served the village of Wattsville. It marked the position of the end on junction between the Sirhowy and Monmouthshire tramroads, being nine miles from the end of the Monmouthshire section of the tramroad at Llanarth St, Newport. Marshalling yards to the north were for the Nine Mile Point Colliery.  Nine Mile Point had two signal boxes, No 1 & 2 within short distance of each other.  This was due to the very narrow valley allowing just an up and down line.  Traffic between the marshalling yards and the colliery was considerable needing the use of two signal boxes.  Little remains of this site other than a water tower foundations and evidence of a platform. At its peak there were 11 daily services between Nine Mile point and Newport or Tredegar.

References

Disused railway stations in Caerphilly County Borough
Former London and North Western Railway stations
Railway stations in Great Britain opened in 1869
Railway stations in Great Britain closed in 1959
1869 establishments in Wales
1959 disestablishments in Wales